Knud Valdemar Gylding Holmboe (22 April 1902 Horsens Denmark – 13 October 1931 Aqaba, Jordan) was a Danish journalist, author and explorer who converted from Protestantism to Catholicism in 1921, and, after a sojourn in North Africa, ultimately converted to Islam in 1929. Six years later, he published a book of his experiences on a journey through Libya, that later became famous.  The book exposed the maltreatment of the population the author had witnessed on his journey and the atrocities committed by the Italian colonial power. This account is especially valuable for its description of the concentration camps into which Italian colonial powers forced Bedouin Arabs and where "torture, humiliation, and famine" were rife. Holmboe was murdered on his way to Makkah in Aqaba in October 1931. Some suspect that Italian intelligence officials, connected to the regime of Benito Mussolini, conspired in his death.

Knud Holmboe was the elder brother of Danish composer Vagn Holmboe.

Biography

Early life
Knud Holmboe was born as the eldest son of a well-known Danish merchant family in Horsens, Jutland. In his late teenage years he became more and more interested in religion and philosophy, and at the age of twenty, he moved into a monastery in Clervaux/Clerf, in northern Luxembourg, converting to Catholicism in 1921.

Career and travels
After finishing an education as a journalist, he started to work for various Danish local papers. However, in search of deeper religious knowledge, he traveled to Morocco in 1924, and became acquainted with Islam. During a meeting with a sheikh, he realized that he belonged to Islam and converted the following year. His first book Between the Devil and the Deep Sea. A Dash by Plane to Seething Morocco was translated from the Danish and published in 1924 by Klinte Publishers.

After returning to Denmark, he wrote two books recounting his experiences in Morocco.
In 1925, he began a journey across the countries of the Middle East (Turkey, Syria, Palestine, Iraq and Persia). In 1927, he travelled through the Balkan and witnessed in Albania the mistreatment of the population by Italian troops. He took a photograph of the hanging of a dissident Catholic priest by Mussolini's soldiers in Albania. This picture was published in newspapers around the globe and, along with articles that went public all over Europe, infuriated the Italian authorities.

Back in Denmark, he experienced economic difficulties and in 1928 he ultimately took the decision to leave the country along with his wife Nora and his daughter Aisha who was born earlier that year. He went to Morocco for the second time, settled down with his family and changed his name to Ali Ahmed el Gheseiri.

Two years later, in 1930, his wife took the decision to return with her child to Denmark.
Knud Holmboe, however, developed a plan to travel from Morocco across the Sahara to reach Egypt. It was this journey that made him famous. Driving through the desert in a 1929 Chevrolet, he left the beaten track to discover the communities and landscape of the desert. Holmboe was shocked to observe European violence against the indigenous populations of the North African colonies.

In Libya, he witnessed the shocking treatment of the Libyan Muslim population by Italian colonial troops. Holmboe wrote everything down and many photographs documenting the observations he had made. His activities did not remain unnoticed by the Italians and in the eastern city of Derna, he was arrested and kicked out of Libya. In Egypt, he tried to organize resistance against the Italian colonial powers in Libya. However, after the Italian ambassador had informed the British authorities in Egypt, Holmboe was arrested again and thrown into prison in Cairo. After a month, he was sent home to Denmark.

Back in Denmark, he produced a book in 1931 based on these travel experiences, entitled Desert Encounter condemning the colonial overseers. The book was published both in Denmark, in many other European countries and the USA, but immediately banned in Italy. The Italian colonial powers were outraged at the suggestion that the Muslim population of Libya was being subjected to genocide.

Last years and death
After completing his book, Knud Holmboe started on his hajj, to Makkah in May 1931. Holmboe bought a camel in Amman and travelled to Aqaba (in modern Jordan) where he waited for an entry permit into Ibn Saud ́s territory. On 11 October 1931, he left on his camel towards the Saudi Arabian border spending the night in the vicinity of the Haql oasis. The next day he was attacked by a local Bedouin tribe on the road between al-Haql and Humayda. He managed to escape overnight, but was found the next day and shot on 13 October 1931. The circumstances of the death of Knud Holmboe were never fully explained. While it has been speculated that Italian intelligence ordered the murder, this claim has never been verified.

Notes

External links 
Knud Holmboe-Bridges Foundation
Zahara Books - Danish
Salaam Knowledge
Knud Holmboe

1902 births
1931 deaths
Converts to Islam from Catholicism
Danish Muslims
Danish people murdered abroad
Danish travel writers
People from Horsens
20th-century Danish journalists